A near-Earth object (NEO) is any small Solar System body whose orbit brings it into proximity with Earth. By convention, a Solar System body is a NEO if its closest approach to the Sun (perihelion) is less than 1.3 astronomical units (AU). Most known PHOs and NEOs are asteroids, but a small fraction are comets.

There are over 30,503 known near-Earth asteroids (NEAs) and over a hundred known short-period near-Earth comets (NECs). A number of solar-orbiting meteoroids were large enough to be tracked in space before striking Earth. It is now widely accepted that collisions in the past have had a significant role in shaping the geological and biological history of Earth. Larger asteroids penetrate the atmosphere to the surface of the Earth, producing craters if they impact a continent or tsunamis if they impact the sea. Interest in NEOs has increased since the 1980s because of greater awareness of this potential danger. Asteroid impact avoidance by deflection is possible in principle, and methods of mitigation are being researched.

Two scales, the simple Torino scale and the more complex Palermo scale, rate the risk presented by an identified NEO based on the probability of it impacting the Earth and on how severe the consequences of such an impact would be. Some NEOs have had temporarily positive Torino or Palermo scale ratings after their discovery.

Since 1998, the United States, the European Union, and other nations are scanning the sky for NEOs in an effort called Spaceguard. The initial US Congress mandate to NASA to catalog at least 90% of NEOs that are at least  in diameter, sufficient to cause a global catastrophe, was met by 2011. In later years, the survey effort was expanded to include smaller objects which have the potential for large-scale, though not global, damage.

NEOs have low surface gravity, and many have Earth-like orbits that make them easy targets for spacecraft. , five near-Earth comets and five near-Earth asteroids have been visited by spacecraft. A small sample of one NEO was returned to Earth in 2010, and similar missions are in progress. Preliminary plans for commercial asteroid mining have been drafted by private startup companies, either through the use of robots or even by sending private commercial astronauts to act as space miners.

Definitions 

Near-Earth objects (NEOs) are by convention technically defined as all small Solar System bodies with orbits around the Sun that lie partly between 0.983 and 1.3 astronomical units (AU; Sun–Earth distance) away from the Sun. NEOs are thus not necessarily currently near the Earth, but they can potentially approach the Earth relatively closely.  The term is also sometimes used more flexibly, for example for objects in orbit around the Earth or for quasi-satellites, which have a more complex orbital relationship with the Earth.

When a NEO is detected, like all other small Solar System bodies, its positions and brightness are submitted to the International Astronomical Union's (IAU's) Minor Planet Center (MPC) for cataloging. The MPC maintains separate lists of confirmed NEOs and potential NEOs. The orbits of some NEOs intersect that of the Earth, so they pose a collision danger. These are considered potentially hazardous objects (PHOs) if their estimated diameter is above 140 meters. The MPC maintains a separate list for the asteroids among PHOs, the potentially hazardous asteroids (PHAs). NEOs are also catalogued by two separate units of the Jet Propulsion Laboratory (JPL) of the National Aeronautics and Space Administration (NASA): the Center for Near Earth Object Studies (CNEOS) and the Solar System Dynamics Group.

PHAs are defined based on two parameters relating to respectively their potential to approach the Earth dangerously closely and the estimated consequences that an impact would have if it occurs. Objects with both an Earth minimum orbit intersection distance (MOID) of 0.05 AU or less and an absolute magnitude of 22.0 or brighter (a rough indicator of large size) are considered PHAs. Objects that either cannot approach closer to the Earth i.e. NASA's catalog of near-Earth objects includes the approach distances of asteroids and comets (expressed in lunar distances).

History of human awareness of NEOs 

The first near-Earth objects to be observed by humans were comets. Their extraterrestrial nature was recognised and confirmed only after Tycho Brahe tried to measure the distance of a comet through its parallax in 1577 and the lower limit he obtained was well above the Earth diameter; the periodicity of some comets was first recognised in 1705, when Edmond Halley published his orbit calculations for the returning object now known as Halley's Comet. The 1758–1759 return of Halley's Comet was the first comet appearance predicted. It has been said that Lexell's comet of 1770 was the first discovered Near-Earth object.

The first near-Earth asteroid to be discovered was 433 Eros in 1898. The asteroid was subject to several extensive observation campaigns, primarily because measurements of its orbit enabled a precise determination of the then imperfectly known distance of the Earth from the Sun.

In 1937, asteroid 69230 Hermes was discovered when it passed the Earth at twice the distance of the Moon. Hermes was considered a threat because it was lost after its discovery; thus its orbit and potential for collision with Earth were not known precisely. Hermes was only re-discovered in 2003, and it is now known to be no threat for at least the next century.

During this approach, Icarus became the first minor planet to be observed using radar, with measurements obtained at the Haystack Observatory and the Goldstone Tracking Station. This was the first close approach predicted years in advance (Icarus had been discovered in 1949), and also earned significant public attention, due to alarmist news reports. A year before the approach, MIT students launched Project Icarus, devising a plan to deflect the asteroid with rockets in case it was found to be on a collision course with Earth. Project Icarus received wide media coverage, and inspired the 1979 disaster movie Meteor, in which the US and the USSR join forces to blow up an Earth-bound fragment of an asteroid hit by a comet.

If the asteroid had impacted it would have created the largest explosion in recorded history, equivalent to 20,000 megatons of TNT. It attracted widespread attention because it was discovered only after the closest approach.

In March 1998, early orbit calculations for recently discovered asteroid  showed a potential 2028 close approach  from the Earth, well within the orbit of the Moon, but with a large error margin allowing for a direct hit. By that time, inaccurate reports of a potential impact had caused a media storm.

Risk 

From the late 1990s, a typical frame of reference in searches for NEOs has been the scientific concept of risk. The risk that any near-Earth object poses is viewed having regard to both the culture and the technology of human society. Through history, humans have associated NEOs with changing risks, based on religious, philosophical or scientific views, as well as humanity's technological or economical capability to deal with such risks. Thus, NEOs have been seen as omens of natural disasters or wars; harmless spectacles in an unchanging universe; the source of era-changing cataclysms or potentially poisonous fumes (during Earth's passage through the tail of Halley's Comet in 1910); and finally as a possible cause of a crater-forming impact that could even cause extinction of humans and other life on Earth.

The potential of catastrophic impacts by near-Earth comets was recognised as soon as the first orbit calculations provided an understanding of their orbits: in 1694, Edmond Halley presented a theory that Noah's flood in the Bible was caused by a comet impact. Human perception of near-Earth asteroids as benign objects of fascination or killer objects with high risk to human society has ebbed and flowed during the short time that NEAs have been scientifically observed. Scientists have recognised the threat of impacts that create craters much bigger than the impacting bodies and have indirect effects on an even wider area since the 1980s, after the confirmation of a theory that the Cretaceous–Paleogene extinction event (in which the non-avian dinosaurs died out) 65 million years ago was caused by a large asteroid impact.

The awareness of the wider public of the impact risk rose after the observation of the impact of the fragments of Comet Shoemaker–Levy 9 into Jupiter in July 1994. In 1998, the movies Deep Impact and Armageddon popularised the notion that near-Earth objects could cause catastrophic impacts. Also at that time, a conspiracy theory arose about the supposed 2003 impact of the fictitious planet Nibiru, which persisted on the internet as the predicted impact date was moved to 2012 and then 2017.

Risk scales 

There are two schemes for the scientific classification of impact hazards from NEOs:
 the simple Torino scale, which rates the risks of impacts in the next 100 years according to impact energy and impact probability, using integer numbers between 0 and 10; and
 the more complex Palermo Technical Impact Hazard Scale, which ascribes ratings that can be any positive or negative real number; these ratings depend on the background impact frequency, impact probability and time until possible impact.

On both scales, risks of any concern are indicated by values above zero.

Magnitude of risk 
The annual background frequency used in the Palermo scale for impacts of energy greater than E megatonnes is estimated as:

For instance, this formula implies that the expected value of the time from now until the next impact greater than 1 megatonne is 33 years, and that when it occurs, there is a 50% chance that it will be above 2.4 megatonnes. This formula is only valid over a certain range of E.

However, another paper published in 2002 – the same year as the paper on that the Palermo scale is based – found a power law with different constants:

This formula gives considerably lower rates for a given E. For instance, it gives the rate for bolides of 10 megatonnes or more (like the Tunguska explosion) as 1 per thousand years, rather than 1 per 210 years as in the Palermo formula. However, the authors give a rather large uncertainty (once in 400 to 1800 years for 10 megatonnes), due in part to uncertainties in determining the energies of the atmospheric impacts that they used in their determination.

Highly rated risks 

NASA maintains an automated system to evaluate the threat from known NEOs over the next 100 years, which generates the continuously updated Sentry Risk Table. All or nearly all of the objects are highly likely to drop off the list eventually as more observations come in, reducing the uncertainties and enabling more accurate orbital predictions.

In March 2002,  became the first asteroid with a temporarily positive rating on the Torino Scale, with about a 1 in 9,300 chance of an impact in 2049. Additional observations reduced the estimated risk to zero, and the asteroid was removed from the Sentry Risk Table in April 2002.

Asteroid  was lost after its 1950 discovery, since its observations over just 17 days were insufficient to precisely determine its orbit; it was rediscovered on December 31, 2000. It has a diameter of about a kilometer (0.6 miles), and an impact would therefore be globally catastrophic. It was observed by radar during its close 2001 approach, allowing much more precise orbit calculations. Although this asteroid will not strike for at least 800 years and thus has no Torino scale rating, it was added to the Sentry list in April 2002 as the first object with a Palermo scale value greater than zero. The then-calculated 1 in 300 maximum chance of impact and +0.17 Palermo scale value was roughly 50% greater than the background risk of impact by all similarly large objects until 2880. Uncertainties in the orbit calculations were further reduced using additional radar observations in 2012, and this decreased the odds of an impact. Taking all radar and optical observations through 2021 into account, the probability of impact in March 2880 is, assessed at 1 in 34,000. The corresponding Palermo scale value of −2.05 is still among the highest for all objects on the Sentry List Table.

On December 24, 2004,  asteroid 99942 Apophis (at the time known only by its provisional designation ) was assigned a 4 on the Torino scale, the highest rating given to date, as the information available at the time translated to a 2.7% chance of Earth impact on Friday, April 13, 2029. By December 28, 2004, additional observations had significantly reduced the uncertainty zone for the 2029 approach and it no longer included the Earth. The 2029 risk of impact consequently dropped to zero, but later potential impact dates were still rated 1 on the Torino scale. Further observations lowered the 2036 risk to a Torino rating of 0 in August 2006. In 2021 Apophis was removed from the Sentry Risk Table.

In February 2006,  was assigned a Torino Scale rating of 2 due to a close encounter predicted for May 4, 2102. After additional observations allowed increasingly precise predictions, the Torino rating was lowered first to 1 in May 2006, then to 0 in October 2006, and the asteroid was removed from the Sentry Risk Table entirely in February 2008.

,  is listed with the highest chance of impacting Earth, at 1 in 22 on September 5, 2095. Observations during the August 2022 close approach are expected to ascertain whether the asteroid will impact or miss Earth in 2095.

Projects to minimize the threat 

The first astronomical program dedicated to the discovery of near-Earth asteroids was the Palomar Planet-Crossing Asteroid Survey. The link to impact hazard, the need for dedicated survey telescopes and options to head off an eventual impact were first discussed at a 1981 interdisciplinary conference in Snowmass, Colorado. Plans for a more comprehensive survey, named the Spaceguard Survey, were developed by NASA from 1992, under a mandate from the United States Congress. To promote the survey on an international level, the International Astronomical Union (IAU) organised a workshop at Vulcano, Italy in 1995, and set up the Spaceguard Foundation also in Italy a year later. In 1998, the United States Congress gave NASA a mandate to detect 90% of near-earth asteroids over  diameter (that threaten global devastation) by 2008.

Several surveys have undertaken "Spaceguard" activities (an umbrella term), including Lincoln Near-Earth Asteroid Research (LINEAR), Spacewatch, Near-Earth Asteroid Tracking (NEAT), Lowell Observatory Near-Earth-Object Search (LONEOS), Catalina Sky Survey (CSS), Campo Imperatore Near-Earth Object Survey (CINEOS), Japanese Spaceguard Association, Asiago-DLR Asteroid Survey (ADAS) and Near-Earth Object WISE (NEOWISE). As a result, the ratio of the known and the estimated total number of near-Earth asteroids larger than 1 km in diameter rose from about 20% in 1998 to 65% in 2004, 80% in 2006, and 93% in 2011. The original Spaceguard goal has thus been met, only three years late. , 891 NEAs larger than 1 km have been discovered, or 97% of an estimated total of about 920.

, it is estimated that less than half of these have been found, but objects of this size hit the earth only about once in 2000 years.

Survey programs aim to identify threats years in advance, giving humanity time to prepare a space mission to avert the threat.

The ATLAS project, by contrast, aims to find impacting asteroids shortly before impact, much too late for deflection maneuvers but still in time to evacuate and otherwise prepare the affected Earth region. Another project, the Zwicky Transient Facility (ZTF), which surveys for objects that change their brightness rapidly, also detects asteroids passing close to Earth.

Scientists involved in NEO research have also considered options for actively averting the threat if an object is found to be on a collision course with Earth. All viable methods aim to deflect rather than destroy the threatening NEO, because the fragments would still cause widespread destruction. Deflection, which means a change in the object's orbit months to years prior to the predicted impact, also requires orders of magnitude less energy.

Number and classification 

Near-Earth objects are classified as meteoroids, asteroids, or comets depending on size, composition, and orbit. Those which are asteroids can additionally be members of an asteroid family, and comets create meteoroid streams that can generate meteor showers.

 and according to statistics maintained by CNEOS, 27,440 NEOs have been discovered. Only 117 (0.43%) of them are comets, whilst 27,323 (99.57%) are asteroids. 2,224 of those NEOs are classified as potentially hazardous asteroids (PHAs).

, over 1,200 NEAs appear on the Sentry impact risk page at the NASA website. Over 1,000 of these NEAs are less than 50 meters in diameter and none of the listed objects are placed even in the "green zone" (Torino Scale 1), meaning that none warrant the attention of the general public.

Observational biases 
The main problem with estimating the number of NEOs is that the probability of detecting one is influenced by a number of  aspects of the NEO, starting naturally with its size but also including the characteristics of its orbit and the reflectivity of its surface.  What is easily detected will be more counted,
and these observational biases need to be compensated when trying to calculate the number of bodies in a population from the list of its detected members.

The other major detection bias is that it is much easier to spot objects on the night-side of Earth.  The day sky near the Sun is much brighter than the night sky, and there is therefore much better contrast in the night sky.  The night-side searcher is also looking at the sunlit side of the asteroids, while in the daytime sky a searcher looks towards the sun and sees the unlit backside of the object. In addition, opposition surge makes asteroids even brighter when the Earth is close to the axis of sunlight. The combined effect is equivalent to the comparison of a Full moon at night to a New Moon in daytime, and the light of the Sun-lit asteroids has been called "full asteroid" similar to a "full moon".  
Evidencing this bias and as depicted in the diagram below, over half (53%) of the known Near Earth objects were discovered in just 3.8% of the sky, in a 22.5° cone facing directly away from the Sun, and the vast majority (87%) were first found in only 15% of the sky, in the 45° cone facing away from the Sun. The most practical way around this opposition bias is to use thermal infrared telescopes in space that observe their heat emissions instead of the light they reflect, with a sensitivity that is almost independent of the illumination.

Asteroids with orbits that make them spend more time on the day-side of the Earth are therefore less likely to be discovered than those that spend most of their time beyond the orbit of the Earth. For example, one study noted that detection of bodies in low-eccentricity Earth-crossing  orbits is favored, making Atens more likely to be detected than Apollos.

Such observational biases must be identified and quantified to determine NEO populations, as studies of asteroid populations then take those known observational selection biases into account to make a more accurate assessment. In the year 2000 and taking into account all known observational biases, it was estimated that there are approximately 900 near-Earth asteroids of at least kilometer size, or technically and more accurately, with an absolute magnitude brighter than 17.75.

Near-Earth asteroids (NEAs) 

These are asteroids in a near-Earth orbit without the tail or coma of a comet. , 30,503 near-Earth asteroids are known, 2,304 of which are both sufficiently large and may come sufficiently close to Earth to be classified as potentially hazardous.

NEAs survive in their orbits for just a few million years. They are eventually eliminated by planetary perturbations, causing ejection from the Solar System or a collision with the Sun, a planet, or other celestial body. With orbital lifetimes short compared to the age of the Solar System, new asteroids must be constantly moved into near-Earth orbits to explain the observed asteroids. The accepted origin of these asteroids is that main-belt asteroids are moved into the inner Solar System through orbital resonances with Jupiter. The interaction with Jupiter through the resonance perturbs the asteroid's orbit and it comes into the inner Solar System. The asteroid belt has gaps, known as Kirkwood gaps, where these resonances occur as the asteroids in these resonances have been moved onto other orbits. New asteroids migrate into these resonances, due to the Yarkovsky effect that provides a continuing supply of near-Earth asteroids. Compared to the entire mass of the asteroid belt, the mass loss necessary to sustain the NEA population is relatively small; totalling less than 6% over the past 3.5 billion years. The composition of near-Earth asteroids is comparable to that of asteroids from the asteroid belt, reflecting a variety of asteroid spectral types.

A small number of NEAs are extinct comets that have lost their volatile surface materials, although having a faint or intermittent comet-like tail does not necessarily result in a classification as a near-Earth comet, making the boundaries somewhat fuzzy. The rest of the near-Earth asteroids are driven out of the asteroid belt by gravitational interactions with Jupiter.

Many asteroids have natural satellites (minor-planet moons). , 85 NEAs were known to have at least one moon, including three known to have two moons.

In May 2022, an algorithm known as Tracklet-less Heliocentric Orbit Recovery or THOR and developed by University of Washington researchers to discover asteroids in the solar system was announced as a success. The International Astronomical Union's Minor Planet Center confirmed a series of first candidate asteroids identified by the algorithm.

Size distribution 

While the size of a very small fraction of these asteroids is known to better than 1%, from radar observations, from images of the asteroid surface, or from stellar occultations, the diameter of the vast majority of near Earth asteroids has only been estimated on the basis of their brightness and a representative asteroid surface reflectivity or albedo, which is commonly assumed to be 14%. Such indirect size estimates are uncertain by over a factor of 2 for individual asteroids, since asteroid albedos can range at least as low as 5% and as high as 30%. This makes the volume of those asteroids uncertain by a factor of 8, and their mass by at least as much, since their assumed density also has its own uncertainty. Diameters of intermediate precision, better than from an assumed albedo but not nearly as precise as good direct measurements, can be obtained from the combination of reflected light and thermal infrared emission, using a thermal model of the asteroid to estimate both its diameter and its albedo. In May 2016, technologist Nathan Myhrvold questioned the precision of such asteroid diameter estimates arising from thermal modeling of measurements by the Wide-field Infrared Survey Explorer and NEOWISE missions. The original version of his criticism itself faced criticism for its methodology and did not pass peer review, but a revised version was subsequently published.

In 2000, NASA reduced from 1,000–2,000 to 500–1,000 its estimate of the number of existing near-Earth asteroids over one kilometer in diameter, or more exactly brighter than an absolute magnitude of 17.75. The NEOWISE estimate differed from other estimates primarily in assuming a slightly lower average asteroid albedo, which produces larger estimated diameters for the same asteroid brightness. This resulted in 911 then known asteroids at least 1 km across, as opposed to the 830 then listed by CNEOS from the same inputs but assuming a slightly higher albedo.

, and using diameters mostly estimated crudely from a measured absolute magnitude and an assumed albedo, 859 NEAs listed by CNEOS, including 152 PHAs, measure at least 1 km in diameter, and 10,362 known NEAs, including 2322 PHAs, are larger than 140 m in diameter.

Orbital classification 

Near-Earth asteroids are divided into groups based on their semi-major axis (a), perihelion distance (q), and aphelion distance (Q):
 The Atiras or Apoheles have orbits strictly inside Earth's orbit: an Atira asteroid's aphelion distance (Q) is smaller than Earth's perihelion distance (0.983 AU). That is, which implies that the asteroid's semi-major axis is also less than 0.983 AU.

 The Atens have a semi-major axis of less than 1 AU and cross Earth's orbit. (0.983 AU is Earth's perihelion distance.)

 The Apollos have a semi-major axis of more than 1 AU and cross Earth's orbit. (1.017 AU is Earth's aphelion distance.)

 The Amors have orbits strictly outside Earth's orbit: an Amor asteroid's perihelion distance (q) is greater than Earth's aphelion distance (1.017 AU). Amor asteroids are also near-earth objects so . In summary, . (This implies that the asteroid's semi-major axis (a) is also larger than 1.017 AU.) Some Amor asteroid orbits cross the orbit of Mars.

(Note: Some authors define Atens differently: they define it as being all the asteroids with a semi-major axis of less than 1 AU. That is, they consider the Atiras to be part of the Atens. Historically, until 1998, there were no known or suspected Atiras, so the distinction wasn't necessary.)

Atiras and Amors do not cross the Earth's orbit and are not immediate impact threats, but their orbits may change to become Earth-crossing orbits in the future.

, 26 Atiras, 2,113 Atens, 15,186 Apollos and 9,998 Amors have been discovered and cataloged.

Co-orbital asteroids 

NEAs on a co-orbital configuration have the same orbital period as the Earth. All co-orbital asteroids have special orbits that are relatively stable and, paradoxically, can prevent them from getting close to Earth:
 Trojans: Near the orbit of a planet, there are five gravitational equilibrium points, the Lagrangian points, in which an asteroid would orbit the Sun in fixed formation with the planet. Two of these, 60 degrees ahead and behind the planet along its orbit (designated L4 and L5 respectively) are stable; that is, an asteroid near these points would stay there for millions of years even if lightly perturbed by other planets and by non-gravitational forces.
 Horseshoe librators: The region of stability around L4 and L5 also includes orbits for co-orbital asteroids that run around both L4 and L5. Relative to the Earth and Sun, the orbit can resemble the circumference of a horseshoe, or may consist of annual loops that wander back and forth (librate) in a horseshoe-shaped area. In both cases, the Sun is at the horseshoe's center of gravity, Earth is in the gap of the horseshoe, and L4 and L5 are inside the ends of the horseshoe. By 2016, 12 horseshoe librators of Earth have been discovered.
 Quasi-satellites: Quasi-satellites are co-orbital asteroids on a normal elliptic orbit with a higher eccentricity than Earth's, which they travel in a way synchronised with Earth's motion. Since the asteroid orbits the Sun slower than Earth when further away and faster than Earth when closer to the Sun, when observed from Earth, the quasi-satellite appears to orbit Earth in a retrograde direction in one year, even though it is not bound gravitationally. By 2016, five asteroids were known to be a quasi-satellite of Earth. 469219 Kamoʻoalewa is Earth's closest quasi-satellite, in an orbit that has been stable for almost a century. Orbit calculations until 2016 showed that all quasi-satellites and four of the horseshoe librators then known repeatedly transfer between horseshoe and quasi-satellite orbits. One of these objects, was observed during its transition from a quasi-satellite orbit to a horseshoe orbit in 2006; it is expected to transfer back to a quasi-satellite orbit sometime around year 2066.
 Temporary satellites: NEAs can also transfer between solar orbits and distant Earth orbits, becoming gravitationally bound temporary satellites.

Meteoroids 

In 1961, the IAU defined meteoroids as a class of solid interplanetary objects distinct from asteroids by their considerably smaller size. This definition was useful at the time because, with the exception of the Tunguska event, all historically observed meteors were produced by objects significantly smaller than the smallest asteroids then observable by telescopes. As the distinction began to blur with the discovery of ever smaller asteroids and a greater variety of observed NEO impacts, revised definitions with size limits have been proposed from the 1990s. In April 2017, the IAU adopted a revised definition that generally limits meteoroids to a size between 30 µm and 1 m in diameter, but permits the use of the term for any object of any size that caused a meteor, thus leaving the distinction between asteroid and meteoroid blurred.

Near-Earth comets 

Near-Earth comets (NECs) are objects in a near-Earth orbit with a tail or coma. Comet nuclei are typically less dense than asteroids but they pass Earth at higher relative speeds, thus the impact energy of a comet nucleus is slightly larger than that of a similar-sized asteroid. NECs may pose an additional hazard due to fragmentation: the meteoroid streams which produce meteor showers may include large inactive fragments, effectively NEAs. Although no impact of a comet in Earth's history has been conclusively confirmed, the Tunguska event may have been caused by a fragment of Comet Encke.

Comets are commonly divided between short-period and long-period comets. Short-period comets, with an orbital period of less than 200 years, originate in the Kuiper belt, beyond the orbit of Neptune; while long-period comets originate in the Oort Cloud, in the outer reaches of the Solar System. The orbital period distinction is of importance in the evaluation of the risk from near-Earth comets because short-period NECs are likely to have been observed during multiple apparitions and thus their orbits can be determined with some precision, while long-period NECs can be assumed to have been seen for the first and last time when they appeared during the Age of Science, thus their approaches cannot be predicted well in advance. Since the threat from long-period NECs is estimated to be at most 1% of the threat from NEAs, and long-period comets are very faint and thus difficult to detect at large distances from the Sun, Spaceguard efforts have consistently focused on asteroids and short-period comets. CNEOS even restricts its definition of NECs to short-period comets—, 117 such objects have been discovered.

, only 23 comets have been observed to pass within  of Earth, including 10 which are or have been short-period comets. Two of these comets, Halley's Comet and 73P/Schwassmann–Wachmann, have been observed during multiple close approaches. The closest observed approach was 0.0151 AU (5.88 LD) for Lexell's Comet on July 1, 1770. After an orbit change due to a close approach of Jupiter in 1779, this object is no longer a NEC. The closest approach ever observed for a current short-period NEC is 0.0229 AU (8.92 LD) for Comet Tempel–Tuttle in 1366. This comet is the parent body of the Leonid meteor shower, which also produced the Great Meteor Storm of 1833. Orbital calculations show that P/1999 J6 (SOHO), a faint sungrazing comet and confirmed short-period NEC observed only during its close approaches to the Sun, passed Earth undetected at a distance of 0.0121 AU (4.70 LD) on June 12, 1999.

Comet 109P/Swift–Tuttle, which is also the source of the Perseid meteor shower every year in August, has a roughly 130-year orbit that passes close to the Earth. During the comet's September 1992 recovery, when only the two previous returns in 1862 and 1737 had been identified, calculations showed that the comet would pass close to Earth during its next return in 2126, with an impact within the range of uncertainty. By 1993, even earlier returns (back to at least 188 AD) have been identified, and the longer observation arc eliminated the impact risk. The comet will pass Earth in 2126 at a distance of 23 million kilometers. In 3044, the comet is expected to pass Earth at less than 1.6 million kilometers.

Artificial near-Earth objects 

Defunct space probes and final stages of rockets can end up in near-Earth orbits around the Sun, and be re-discovered by NEO surveys when they return to Earth's vicinity.

In September 2002, astronomers found an object designated J002E3. The object was on a temporary satellite orbit around Earth, leaving for a solar orbit in June 2003. Calculations showed that it was also on a solar orbit before 2002, but was close to Earth in 1971. J002E3 was identified as the third stage of the Saturn V rocket that carried Apollo 12 to the Moon. In 2006, two more apparent temporary satellites were discovered which were suspected of being artificial. One of them was eventually confirmed as an asteroid and classified as the temporary satellite . The other, 6Q0B44E, was confirmed as an artificial object, but its identity is unknown. Another temporary satellite was discovered in 2013, and was designated  as a suspected asteroid. It was later found to be an artificial object of unknown origin.  is no longer listed as an asteroid by the Minor Planet Center.

In some cases, active space probes on solar orbits have been observed by NEO surveys and erroneously catalogued as asteroids before identification. During its 2007 flyby of Earth on its route to a comet, ESA's space probe Rosetta was detected unidentified and classified as asteroid , with an alert issued due to its close approach. The designation  was similarly removed from asteroid catalogues when the observed object was identified with Gaia, ESA's space observatory for astrometry.

Impacts 

When a near-Earth object impacts Earth, objects up to a few tens of metres across ordinarily explode in the upper atmosphere (usually harmlessly), with most or all of the solids vaporized and only small amounts of meteorites arriving to the Earth surface, while larger objects hit the water surface, forming tsunami waves, or the solid surface, forming impact craters.

The frequency of impacts of objects of various sizes is estimated on the basis of orbit simulations of NEO populations, the frequency of impact craters on the Earth and the Moon, and the frequency of close encounters. The study of impact craters indicates that impact frequency has been more or less steady for the past 3.5 billion years, which requires a steady replenishment of the NEO population from the asteroid main belt. Some other models estimate similar impact frequencies, while others calculate higher frequencies. For Tunguska-sized (10 megaton) impacts, the estimates range from one event every 2,000–3,000 years to one event every 300 years.

The second-largest observed event after the Tunguska meteor was a 1.1 megaton air blast in 1963 near the Prince Edward Islands between South Africa and Antarctica, which was detected only by infrasound sensors. However this may not have been a meteor. The third-largest, but by far best-observed impact, was the Chelyabinsk meteor of 15 February 2013. A previously unknown  asteroid exploded above this Russian city with an equivalent blast yield of 400–500 kilotons. The calculated orbit of the pre-impact asteroid is similar to that of Apollo asteroid , making the latter the meteor's possible parent body.

It was the first time that an asteroid was observed and its impact was predicted prior to its entry into the atmosphere as a meteor. 10.7 kg of meteorites were recovered after the impact.

On 2 January 2014, just 21 hours after it was the first asteroid to be discovered in 2014, 2–4 m  blew up in Earth's atmosphere above the Atlantic Ocean. Far from any land, the meteor explosion was only observed by three infrasound detectors of the Comprehensive Nuclear-Test-Ban Treaty Organization. This impact was the second to be predicted.

Further predicted impacts include 2018 LA around the border between Botswana and South Africa and 2019 MO off Puerto Rico, but asteroid impact prediction remains in its infancy and successfully predicted asteroid impacts are rare. The vast majority of impacts recorded by infrasound sensors designed to detect detonation of nuclear devices are not predicted.

Observed impacts aren't restricted to the surface and atmosphere of Earth. Dust-sized NEOs have impacted man-made spacecraft, including NASA's Long Duration Exposure Facility, which collected interplanetary dust in low Earth orbit for six years from 1984. Impacts on the Moon can be observed as flashes of light with a typical duration of a fraction of a second. The first lunar impacts were recorded during the 1999 Leonid storm. Subsequently, several continuous monitoring programs were launched. , the largest observed lunar impact occurred on 11 September 2013, lasted 8 seconds, and was likely caused by an object  in diameter.

Close approaches 

Each year, several mostly small NEOs pass Earth closer than the distance of the Moon.

On August 10, 1972, a meteor that became known as the 1972 Great Daylight Fireball was witnessed by many people; it moved north over the Rocky Mountains from the U.S. Southwest to Canada. It was an Earth-grazing meteoroid that passed within  of the Earth's surface, and was filmed by a tourist at the Grand Teton National Park in Wyoming with an 8-millimeter color movie camera.

On October 13, 1990, Earth-grazing meteoroid EN131090 was observed above Czechoslovakia and Poland, moving at  along a  trajectory from south to north. It was captured by two all-sky cameras of the European Fireball Network, which for the first time enabled geometric calculations of the orbit of such a body.

On March 18, 2004, LINEAR announced that a  asteroid, 2004 FH, would pass the Earth that day at only , about one-tenth the distance to the Moon, and the closest miss ever noticed until then. They estimated that similar-sized asteroids come as close about every two years.

Because it was very small (6 meters/20 feet), FU162 was detected only hours before its closest approach. If it had collided with Earth, it probably would have disintegrated harmlessly in the atmosphere.

The asteroid was not visible to the unaided eye. This was the first close passage of an object discovered during a previous passage, and was thus the first to be predicted well in advance.

Exploratory missions 

Some NEOs are of special interest because they can be physically explored with lower mission velocity than is necessary for even the Moon, due to their combination of low velocity with respect to Earth and weak gravity. They may present interesting scientific opportunities both for direct geochemical and astronomical investigation, and as potentially economical sources of extraterrestrial materials for human exploitation. This makes them an attractive target for exploration.

Missions to NEAs 

The IAU held a minor planets workshop in Tucson, Arizona, in March 1971. At that point, launching a spacecraft to asteroids was considered premature; the workshop only inspired the first astronomical survey specifically aiming for NEAs. Missions to asteroids were considered again during a workshop at the University of Chicago held by NASA's Office of Space Science in January 1978. Of all of the near-Earth asteroids (NEA) that had been discovered by mid-1977, it was estimated that spacecraft could rendezvous with and return from only about 1 in 10 using less propulsive energy than is necessary to reach Mars. It was recognised that due to the low surface gravity of all NEAs, moving around on the surface of an NEA would cost very little energy, and thus space probes could gather multiple samples. Overall, it was estimated that about one percent of all NEAs might provide opportunities for human-crewed missions, or no more than about ten NEAs known at the time. A five-fold increase in the NEA discovery rate was deemed necessary to make a crewed mission within ten years worthwhile.

The first near-Earth asteroid to be visited by a spacecraft was  asteroid 433 Eros when NASA's Near Earth Asteroid Rendezvous (NEAR) probe orbited it from February 2001, landing on the asteroid surface in February 2002.

The  Apollo asteroid 162173 Ryugu is the target of JAXA's Hayabusa2 mission. The space probe was launched in December 2014, arrived at the asteroid in June 2018, and returned a sample to Earth in December 2020. The  Apollo asteroid 101955 Bennu, which, has the highest cumulative Palermo scale rating (−1.41 for several close encounters between 2178 and 2290), is the target of NASA's OSIRIS-REx probe. The New Frontiers program mission was launched in September 2016. On its two-year journey to Bennu, the probe had searched for Earth's Trojan asteroids, rendezvoused with Bennu in August 2018, and had entered into orbit around the asteroid in December 2018. OSIRIS-REx will return samples from the asteroid in September 2023.

In April 2012, the company Planetary Resources announced its plans to mine asteroids commercially. In a first phase, the company reviewed data and selected potential targets among NEAs. In a second phase, space probes would be sent to the selected NEAs; mining spacecraft would be sent in a third phase. Planetary Resources launched two testbed satellites in April 2015 and January 2018, and the first prospecting satellite for the second phase was planned for a 2020 launch prior to the company closing and its assets purchased by ConsnSys Space in 2018.

On September 26, 2022, the DART spacecraft impacted Dimorphos, in a test of a method of planetary defense against near-Earth objects.

Missions to NECs 

The first near-Earth comet visited by a space probe was 21P/Giacobini–Zinner in 1985, when the NASA/ESA probe International Cometary Explorer (ICE) passed through its coma. In March 1986, ICE, along with Soviet probes Vega 1 and Vega 2, ISAS probes Sakigake and Suisei and ESA probe Giotto flew by the nucleus of Halley's Comet. In 1992, Giotto also visited another NEC, 26P/Grigg–Skjellerup.

In November 2010, the NASA probe Deep Impact flew by the near-Earth comet 103P/Hartley. Earlier, in July 2005, this probe flew by the non-near-Earth comet Tempel 1, hitting it with a large copper mass.

In August 2014, ESA probe Rosetta began orbiting near-Earth comet 67P/Churyumov–Gerasimenko, while its lander Philae landed on its surface in November 2014. After the end of its mission, Rosetta was crashed into the comet's surface in 2016.

See also 

 Asteroid capture
 Asteroid Day
 Asteroid impact prediction
 Asteroid Redirect Mission
 Claimed moons of Earth
 Double Asteroid Redirection Test
 Earth-grazing fireball
 Euronear
 List of Earth-crossing minor planets
 List of impact craters on Earth
 Near Earth Object Camera
 NEOShield 
 NEODyS
 Orbit@home

References

External links

 Center for Near Earth Object Studies (CNEOS) – Jet Propulsion Laboratory, NASA
 Table of Asteroids Next Closest Approaches to the Earth – Sormano Astronomical Observatory
 Earth In The Cosmic Shooting – D.J. Asher, The Observatory, 2005
 Catalogue of the Solar System Small Bodies Orbital Evolution – Samara State Technical University
 Current Map Of The Solar System – Armagh Observatory

 Minor Planet Center
 The NEO Confirmation Page
  
  

Articles containing video clips
 
Planetary defense
Space hazards